Marcel Rüedi (born November 1, 1938 in Winterthur, died September 25, 1986 in Makalu) was a Swiss mountaineer who reached the summit of ten of the eight-thousanders.

In 1980, Rüedi ascended Dhaulagiri. In 1981 he forged a new route along the North Face of the Eiger in the Bernese Alps. In 1983, together with Erhard Loretan and Jean-Claude Sonnenwyl, Rüedi managed to climb the three main summits of the Gasherbrum Group within 15 days, reaching Gasherbrum I via a standard route variation. In 1984, he reached the peaks of Manaslu and Nanga Parbat, officially climbing five eight-thousanders in only twelve months.

In 1986, Rüedi was the first Swiss, along with Peter Habeler, to summit Cho Oyu. That same year, he and Krzysztof Wielicki attempted to climb Makalu via a standard route variation. Wielicki reached the summit a few hours before Rüedi and was able to descend to the nearest bivouac shelter. Rüedi did not succeed. Reinhold Messner, who was also at Makalu at the time, claims to have seen Rüedi descending from the summit, and watched as he disappeared behind a snowdrift. Messner later found Rüedi sitting dead in the snow just below his camp.

References

External links 
 Official website (in German)

Swiss mountain climbers
1938 births
1986 deaths
People from Winterthur
Sportspeople from the canton of Zürich